This is a list of tennis players who have represented the Argentina Davis Cup team in an official Davis Cup match. Argentina have taken part in the competition since 1921.

Players

References

Davis Cup
Lists of Davis Cup tennis players